Jiangkou County is a county under the jurisdiction of the prefecture-level city of Tongren, in the northeast of Guizhou Province, China.

Area: 

Population: 220,000 in 2002.

Postal Code: 554400.

The county government is located in Shuangjiang town.

Climate

References

External links
Official website of Jiangkou County Government 

County-level divisions of Guizhou